Yasco Sports Complex is a multi-use stadium in St. John's, Antigua and Barbuda.  

It is currently used mostly for football (soccer) matches. 

The stadium holds 1,000 people.

See also

External links
 From Worldstadiums.com

Sports venues in Antigua and Barbuda
Buildings and structures in St. John's, Antigua and Barbuda
Sport in St. John's, Antigua and Barbuda
Athletics (track and field) venues in Antigua and Barbuda
Football venues in Antigua and Barbuda